The Seton Hall Pirates are the intercollegiate athletic sports teams representing Seton Hall University, located in South Orange, New Jersey. The Pirates compete as a member of the NCAA Division I level (non-football sub-level), primarily competing in the Big East Conference for all sports since the 1979–80 season. Men's sports include baseball, basketball, cross country, golf, soccer and swimming & diving;  women's sports include basketball, cross country, golf, soccer, softball, swimming & diving, tennis and volleyball. Seton Hall canceled football (which was played in Division III) in 1982.

The university's athletic director is Bryan Felt. The program's mascot is The Pirate and colors are blue, gray, and white.

Teams

Men's

Basketball

The university first sponsored men's basketball in 1903. The program won the National Invitation Tournament (NIT) in 1953 and lost in the finals of the 1989 NCAA Tournament to Michigan, 80–79 in overtime.

Defunct

Football
The school sponsored football from 1882 to 1932 and from 1973 to 1982. The sport's second stint at the school came in Division III.  The sport was dropped in 1982.

References

External links 
 
 Seton Hall University Athletics Collection, SHU 0020, Seton Hall University

 
Sports teams in the New York metropolitan area